The Warner-Cather House is a historic house in Red Cloud, Nebraska. It was built in the 1890s for Joseph Warner, an immigrant from England, and his American wife Sylvia. In 1904, it was purchased by Charles F. Cather, who lived here with his wife Mary. Their grown daughter, author Willa Cather, visited them for Christmas. The house has been listed on the National Register of Historic Places since August 11, 1982.

References

National Register of Historic Places in Webster County, Nebraska
Houses on the National Register of Historic Places in Nebraska
Willa Cather